Stefanie is a 1958 West German comedy film directed by Josef von Báky and starring Carlos Thompson, Sabine Sinjen and Rainer Penkert. It was followed by a 1960 sequel Stefanie in Rio.

Cast
 Sabine Sinjen as Stefanie Gonthar
 Carlos Thompson as Architekt Pablo Guala
 Rainer Penkert as Hannes Gonthar
 Peter Vogel as Andreas Gonthar
 Mady Rahl as Sonja
 Elisabeth Flickenschildt as Wirtschafterin Frau Hantke
 Lore Hartling as Pablos Schwester Blanca Guala
 Christiane Maybach as Gabriele
 Gisela Fackeldey as Verkäuferin
 Fritz Eberth as Zwei-Meter-Türhüter
 Benno Hoffmann as Herr "Großer Bär"
 Veronika Götz as Dicke Emma
 Wolfgang Kühne as Lehrer
 Hilde Volk as Lehrerin Frl. Borsig
 Anneliese Würtz as Frau Mohrendiek
 Helmuth Lohner (uncredited)

References

Bibliography 
 Davidson, John & Hake, Sabine. Framing the Fifties: Cinema in a Divided Germany. Berghahn Books, 2007.

External links 
 

1958 films
1958 romantic comedy films
German romantic comedy films
West German films
1950s German-language films
Films directed by Josef von Báky
Films based on German novels
UFA GmbH films
1950s German films